Dekhatbhuli is a village development committee in Kanchanpur District in  Sudurpashchim Province of south-western Nepal. At the time of the 1991 Nepal census it had a population of 8304 people living in 1080 individual households. Kalagaudi is one of the villages of this village development committee.

References

Populated places in Kanchanpur District